Arisaig railway station serves the village of Arisaig on the west coast of the Highland region of Scotland. The westernmost station on the Network Rail network, it is the only one of the four cardinal points of the national network that is not a terminus. ScotRail, who manage the station, operate all services.

History 

Arisaig station opened on 1 April 1901. The station was laid out with two platforms, one on either side of a crossing loop. There is a siding on the south side of the line, east of the Down platform.

Opened by the North British Railway, it became part of the London and North Eastern Railway during the Grouping of 1923. The station was host to a LNER camping coach from 1936 to 1939. The station then passed on to the Scottish Region of British Railways on nationalisation in 1948.

A camping coach was also positioned here by the Scottish Region from 1952 to 1960, the coach was replaced in 1961 by a Pullman camping coach which was joined by another Pullman in 1966. From 1967 to 1969 there were 2 standard camping coaches here, all camping coaches in the region were withdrawn at the end of the 1969 season.

When sectorisation was introduced by British Rail in the 1980s, the station was served by ScotRail until the privatisation of British Rail.

Signalling 

From the time of its opening in 1901, the Mallaig Extension Railway was worked throughout by the electric token system. Arisaig signal box was situated at the east end of the Down platform, on the south side of the line.

On 14 March 1982, the method of working on the section between Arisaig and Mallaig was changed to One Train Working (with train staff). The crossing loop and siding at Arisaig were temporarily put out of use on 13 November 1983 and all the semaphore signals were removed. All trains then used the Down loop. The One Train Working section became Glenfinnan - Mallaig.

On 29 April 1984, the crossing loop was reinstated to cater for the steam trains, but with train-operated points at each end. Arisaig token station could be switched in or out as required. When it was switched out, the Arisaig - Mallaig train staff would be padlocked to the Glenfinnan - Arisaig key token.

The Radio Electronic Token Block (RETB) system was commissioned between Mallaig Junction (now called Fort William Junction) and Mallaig on 6 December 1987 by British Rail. This resulted in the closure of Arisaig signal box (amongst others). The RETB is controlled from a Signalling Centre at Banavie railway station. The Train Protection & Warning System (TPWS) was installed in 2003.

Facilities 

Both platforms have benches, but only platform 2 has a specific waiting shelter (although platform 1 does have a help point). There is a car park next to platform 1, with step-free access to the platform. However, the only access to platform 2 is via one of two barrow crossings. As there are no facilities to purchase tickets, passengers must buy one in advance, or from the guard on the train.

Passenger volume 

The statistics cover twelve month periods that start in April.

Services 
On weekdays and Saturdays, four trains a day call at Arisaig on the way to Mallaig or Fort William, and three of the latter go on further to Glasgow. The last eastbound train of the day connects into the overnight Caledonian Sleeper to Glasgow, Edinburgh Waverley and London Euston at Fort William on weekdays. Sunday services are less frequent, with three trains each way.

References

Bibliography

External links 

 Station on navigable O.S. map
 RAILSCOT on Mallaig Extension Railway

Railway stations in Highland (council area)
Former North British Railway stations
Railway stations in Great Britain opened in 1901
Railway stations served by ScotRail
Listed railway stations in Scotland
Category B listed buildings in Highland (council area)
Cardinal points of the Great British railway network